Turrisipho voeringi is a species of sea snail, a marine gastropod mollusk in the family Colidae, the true whelks and the like.

References

External links
 Bouchet, P. & Warén, A. (1985). Revision of the Northeast Atlantic bathyal and abyssal Neogastropoda excluding Turridae (Mollusca, Gastropoda). Bollettino Malacologico. supplement 1: 121-296

Colidae
Gastropods described in 1985